Zhang Yaoling (344–355), courtesy name Yuanshu, formally Duke Ai of Xiping, was briefly the ruler of the Chinese state Former Liang in 353 and early 354.

Zhang Yaoling was the oldest son of his father Zhang Chonghua (Duke Jinglie) and therefore was designated his heir apparent.  When Zhang Chonghua died in 353, he succeeded Zhang Chonghua as the ruler of Former Liang (with the title Duke of Xiping), but actual power was in the hands of his uncle, Zhang Zuo the Marquess of Changning.  In early 354, Zhang Zuo, who had carried on an affair with Zhang Chonghua's mother Princess Dowager Ma, gained her support to take over as ruler, and Zhang Yaoling was demoted to the title of Marquess of Liangning.

Zhang Zuo was a violent and frivolous ruler, and there was soon much opposition against him, particularly after he completely broke away from Jin Dynasty.  In 355, the generals Zhang Guan and Song Hun rebelled against Zhang Zuo and announced that they wished to restore Zhang Yaoling.  In response, Zhang Zuo executed Zhang Yaoling by beating him to death.  Zhang Zuo, however, would soon be overthrown and replaced by Zhang Yaoling's younger brother Zhang Xuanjing.

Notes

References

4th-century Chinese monarchs
Monarchs of Former Liang
344 births
355 deaths
People from Wuwei